The Episcopal Church of the Advent / St. John's Chapel is an historic Carpenter Gothic style Episcopal church building located at Franklin and Washington streets in Cape May, Cape May County, New Jersey, United States. Its board and batten siding, steep roofs, lancet windows and rose window are distinguishing features of Carpenter Gothic style architecture, although it lacks the usual belfry tower front entrance. Designed by the architect Henry Sims, it was built by Richard Soder beginning in 1865 for St. John's Chapel, a "summer chapel", which had been organized two years earlier. It was not consecrated, however, until 1871.

In 1950, St. John's merged with the Episcopal Church of the Advent, which had been formed in 1899 to serve the needs of local Episcopalians during the other three seasons of the year. The new congregation took the name Episcopal Church of the Advent / St. John's Chapel. It is an active parish in the Episcopal Diocese of New Jersey. Its rector is the Rev. H. Alan Leonard. The Rev. Daniel Hall is assisting clergy.

The Episcopal Church of the Advent / St. John's Chapel is a contributing property in the Cape May Historic District, which was added to the National Register of Historic Places in 1970.

References

External links

 Parish website

Episcopal church buildings in New Jersey
Churches in Cape May County, New Jersey
Carpenter Gothic church buildings in New Jersey
Cape May, New Jersey
Historic district contributing properties in New Jersey
National Register of Historic Places in Cape May County, New Jersey
Churches completed in 1865
19th-century Episcopal church buildings
Churches on the National Register of Historic Places in New Jersey